Vozes da Maturidade is a Brazilian podcast released on June 18, 2022. The podcast addresses autism in older people.

History 
Vozes da Maturidade is directed and presented by Selma Sueli Silva and Sophia Mendonça, who are vloggers from the YouTube channel Mundo Autista and both autistic women. This is the sixth documentary produced by Mundo Autista.

This podcast talks about the experiences of elderly autistic people, reports of elderly people who suspect they are autistic, their experiences in family and society, as well as reports from professionals who work with elderly autistic people. Vozes da Maturidade was released on Autistic Pride Day.

According to Silva, the objective is to address issues that are often little explored or almost unknown about autism, such as autism in adults, autism in females, reflections on the rights and treatments of people with disabilities, among other topics related to inclusion and human diversity. About the work, Mendonça declared that we have been moving little by little in the production of knowledge about autism in adults, but there is still a long way of understanding and study ahead when we talk about autism after adolescence. For her, there is the knowledge that adults demand other types of support. After all, they have a very different day-to-day life than children, with the demands of adult life. In addition, autistic adults accumulate a baggage of experience and repertoires that can camouflage or mask autism. So, in the case of the elderly, all of this becomes even more complex. For the director, even access to the medical report is much more difficult in these cases.

References 

Audio podcasts
Audio documentaries